The internal spermatic fascia (infundibuliform fascia, or Le deuxième fascia de Webster) is a thin layer, which loosely invests the spermatic cord.

Structure 

The internal spermatic fascia is derived from the transversalis fascia. It is acquired by the spermatic cord at the deep inguinal ring. It has very little lymphatic drainage. It is mainly supplied by sensory afferents and the sympathetic nervous system.

Additional images

References

External links 
  - "The inguinal canal and derivation of the layers of the spermatic cord."
 
 

Scrotum